Johannes Høyer (born 19 January 1883) was a Norwegian judge and politician.

He was born in Arendal to priest Hans Anton Høyer and Jørgine Marianne Petersen. He graduated as cand.jur. in 1906. He was elected representative to the Storting for the period 1925–1927, for the Conservative Party. He served as mayor of Bodø from 1928 to 1931. From 1928 to 1939 he was a public prosecutor of Nordland lagsogn. In 1939 he was appointed as a district stipendiary magistrate of Hedmark.

References

1883 births
1960 deaths
People from Arendal
Norwegian judges
Conservative Party (Norway) politicians
Members of the Storting
Mayors of places in Nordland